2-Bromodeschloroketamine (also known as 2-Br-2'-Oxo-PCM and Bromoketamine) is a chemical compound of the arylcyclohexylamine class, which is an analog of the dissociative anesthetic drug ketamine in which the chlorine atom has been replaced with a bromine atom.  It is used in scientific research as a comparison or control compound in studies into the metabolism of ketamine and norketamine, and has also been sold online alongside arylcyclohexylamine designer drugs, though it is unclear whether bromoketamine has similar pharmacological activity.

See also
 2-Fluorodeschloroketamine
 3-Fluorodeschloroketamine
 Deschloroketamine
 Methoxyketamine
 Trifluoromethyldeschloroketamine

References

Arylcyclohexylamines
Designer drugs
Ketones
Phenol ethers